Exostoma laticaudata is a species of sisorid catfish  from Manipur, India.

References

Catfish of Asia
Fish of India
Taxa named by Laifrakpam Arun Kumar
Fish described in 2020
Sisoridae